Gribi būt miljonārs? (English translation: Want to be a millionaire?) was a Latvian game show based on the original British format of Who Wants to Be a Millionaire?.

The show was hosted by Ģirts Līcis (earlier by Mārtiņš Ķibilds).

Gribi būt miljonārs? was broadcast from 2002 to 2008. It was shown on the Latvian TV station TV3 on Wednesday at 20:20 (UTC+2).

Rules
The main goal of the game was to win 50,000 lati (20,000 lati - 2003 to 2005 and 10,000 lati - 2002 to 2003) by answering 15 multiple-choice questions correctly. When a contestant got the fifth question correct, he would leave with at least 100 lati (50 lati - 2003 to 2005 and 25 lati - 2002 to 2003). When a contestant got the tenth question correct, he would leave with at least 1,000 lati (500 lati - 2003 to 2005 and 320 lati - 2002 to 2003). There were three lifelines - "fifty fifty", "phone a friend" and "ask the audience". Later, at the third season, there was sometimes a fourth lifeline, that you could get if you answer at least five questions. It was called, "three wise men". It meant, that in 30 seconds three celebrities could tell you what they think is the answer to the question.

Prizes

Winners 
There is only one winner in Latvian version, Elita Rumpe, who win 10,000 lati on 18 December 2002.

Gallery

References

Who Wants to Be a Millionaire?
2000s Latvian television series
2002 Latvian television series debuts
2008 Latvian television series endings
TV3 (Latvia) original programming